Dubai Banking Group is the global shari'a compliant financial investor of Dubai Group with assets valued at over USD 10 billion (AED 36.7 billion). The group was established in 2007 when Dubai Islamic Investment Group, founded in 2004, and Dubai Bank, founded in 2002, consolidated their activities to form Dubai Banking Group.

Dubai Banking Group's major investments include:
 100% ownership of Dubai Bank
 100% ownership of Dubai Tadawul, a Dubai-based private brokerage company 
 51% stake in Al Fajer Re-Takaful, a closed Kuwaiti shareholding company 
 40% stake in Bank Islam, Malaysia's oldest and largest Islamic bank 
 40% stake in ACR Re-Takaful Holdings Limited, the world's largest reinsurance company 
 33.33% stake in National Bonds UAE, the national Shari'ah-compliant saving scheme
 18.75% stake in BankIslami Pakistan, the first bank to receive an Islamic Banking License in Pakistan

See also
Dubai Group

References

External links
Official website
Dubai Banking Group

Investment companies of the United Arab Emirates

id:Dubai Investment Group